Kris Austin (born 1979) is the former leader of the People's Alliance of New Brunswick and current member of the Progressive Conservative Party of New Brunswick and an MLA in the Legislative Assembly of New Brunswick. On October 13, 2022 he was appointed minister of public safety and solicitor-general by Premier Blaine Higgs.

Austin led the People's Alliance into the 2010 provincial election and 2014 provincial elections in which the party won no seats. In the 2018 provincial election the party won three seats including Austin's riding of Fredericton-Grand Lake. He was re-elected in the 2020 provincial election in which his party lost one seat, electing two MLAs.

On March 30, 2022, Austin announced he will be leaving the People's Alliance of New Brunswick to join the Progressive Conservative Party of New Brunswick.

Austin is a Baptist minister and has worked in public relations.

Austin's appointment to provincial cabinet in the Higgs government was denounced by the Societe de l’Acadie du Nouveau-Brunswick due to his opposition to Acadian rights and official bilingualism.

Election results

References

New Brunswick political party leaders
Living people
People's Alliance of New Brunswick MLAs
1979 births
21st-century Canadian Baptist ministers
Politicians from Hamilton, Ontario
New Brunswick municipal councillors
Politicians from Fredericton